Franco Sebastián Sosa (born 4 April 1981) is an Argentine football defender currently playing for Ñuñorco.

Career 
Born in Monteros, Tucumán Province, Sosa started his playing career in 2001 with Gimnasia y Esgrima de Jujuy of the Argentine 2nd division. He was part of the team that won the Clausura 2005 and obtained promotion to the Argentine Primera. Sosa played for Gimnasia until the end of 2006, making over 100 appearances for the club, 43 in the Primera.

During the January 2006 transfer window Sosa joined Racing Club, quickly establishing himself as a key member of their defence, making appearances in 33 of the club's 38 matches in 2007.

He played for the FC Lorient (French Premier League) during the 2009–2010 season.  He signed a 3-year contract, on 22 July 2009.

In 2011, he returned to Argentina to play with Boca Juniors.

Titles

References

External links
 Football-Lineups player profile
 

1981 births
Living people
Sportspeople from Tucumán Province
Argentine footballers
Association football defenders
Gimnasia y Esgrima de Jujuy footballers
Racing Club de Avellaneda footballers
FC Lorient players
Boca Juniors footballers
Juventud Antoniana footballers
Cúcuta Deportivo footballers
Talleres de Perico footballers
Concepción Fútbol Club players
Argentine Primera División players
Primera Nacional players
Torneo Argentino A players
Torneo Argentino B players
Categoría Primera A players
Ligue 1 players
Argentine expatriate footballers
Expatriate footballers in France
Expatriate footballers in Colombia
Argentine expatriate sportspeople in France
Argentine expatriate sportspeople in Colombia